Inge Meysel (30 May 1910 – 10 July 2004) was a German actress. From the early 1960s until her death, Meysel was one of Germany's most popular actresses. She had a successful stage career and played more than 100 roles in film and on television.

Life and work 

Born Ingeborg Charlotte Hansen, the daughter of Anna Hansen, who was Danish, and Julius Meysel, a German Jew. She attended drama schools in Berlin from 1928 until 1930, thereafter she was on stage in Zwickau, Leipzig and Berlin.

During Nazi Germany, Meysel was banned from performing from 1935 until 1945 because of her Jewish father.  In 1945 she restarted her career in Hamburg.

Since the early 1960s Inge Meysel mainly acted in made-for-TV films and got the nickname (Fernseh-) Mutter der Nation ("(Television) Mother of the Nation").

She won numerous German actor awards including a lifetime achievement award from the German Television Awards, but in 1981 she refused to accept the Bundesverdienstkreuz because "Einen Orden dafür, daß man anständig gelebt hat, brauche ich nicht" ("I don't need an order of merit just for having lived decently").

From the mid-1920s until shortly before her death, Meysel was outspoken on many – often controversial – social and political issues. Despite her decidedly leftist and feminist views, this did not harm her popularity as an actress. In 1992, she came out as bisexual.

In 2004, aged 94, she died of heart failure at her home in Bullenhausen near Hamburg. She was cremated and her ashes were buried near her second husband the Austrian film producer  (1918–1965) at Ohlsdorf Main Cemetery, Hamburg.

Selected filmography

Television
 Die Wäscherin des Herrn Bonaparte (1954, based on Madame Sans-Gêne), as Catherine Hübscher
 Im sechsten Stock (TV series, 3 episodes, 1954–55), as Germaine Lescalier
 Die Heiratsvermittlerin (1955, based on The Matchmaker), as Dolly Levi
 Ein Mann für Jenny (1956, based on The Reluctant Debutante), as Sheila Broadbent
 Kabale und Liebe (1959, based on Intrigue and Love), as Miller's wife
 Im sechsten Stock (TV series, 3 episodes, 1959), as Germaine Lescalier (remake of the 1954/55 TV series)
 Die Zeit und die Conways (1960, based on Time and the Conways), as Mrs. Conway
 Das Fenster zum Flur (1960), as Anni Wiesner
 Madame Sans-Gêne (1960, based on Madame Sans-Gêne), as Catherine Hübscher (remake of Die Wäscherin des Herrn Bonaparte)
 Schau heimwärts, Engel (1961, based on Look Homeward, Angel), as Eliza Gant
  (1962, based on The Beaver Coat), as Mother Wolff
  (1963), as Anna Thielecke
 Wachet und singet (1964, based on Awake and Sing!), as Bessie Berger
 Die Unverbesserlichen (TV series, 7 episodes, 1965–71), as Käthe Scholz
  (TV series, 13 episodes, 1966–68), as Gertrud Stranitzki
  (1969, based on The Rats), as Mrs. John
  (TV series, 13 episodes, 1969–70), as Ida Rogalski
 So war Mama (1969, based on I Remember Mama), as Mama
 Weh' dem, der erbt (1969, based on the Mrs Thursday series), as Alice Thursday
 Keiner erbt für sich allein (1970, based on the Mrs Thursday series), as Alice Thursday
  (TV series, 6 episodes, 1973), as Irene König
  (TV miniseries, 6 episodes, 1974), as Erika Seipold
 Ihr 106. Geburtstag (1979), as Mamouret
 Bühne frei für Kolowitz (1980, based on Enter Laughing), as Emma Kolowitz
 Mrs. Harris (TV series, 6 episodes, 1982–91, based on the "Mrs. 'Arris" novels by Paul Gallico), as Ada Harris
 Derrick - Season 12, Episode 8: "Schwester Hilde" (1985), as Schwester Hilde
 Die Erbschaft (1987), as Wilhelmine Eisel
 The State Chancellery (1989)
  (1995), as Elisabeth Kampnagel
  (2001), as Ruth Levenstein
  (2004), as Elisabeth Kampnagel (final film role)

Film
 Love '47 (1949)
 My Niece Susanne (1950)
 Taxi-Kitty (1950)
 Shadows in the Night (1950)
 The Dubarry (1951)
 Sensation in San Remo (1951)
 Tanzende Sterne (1952)
 Under the Thousand Lanterns (1952)
 The Man of My Life (1954)
 Des Teufels General (1955)
 Uns gefällt die Welt (1956)
 Doctor Crippen Lives (1958)
 Nasser Asphalt (1958)
 Immer die Radfahrer (1958)
 The Girl from the Marsh Croft (1958)
  (1960)
 You Must Be Blonde on Capri (1961)
  (1961), as Germaine Lescalier (Remake of the 1954/55 TV series)
 Her Most Beautiful Day (1962), as Anni Wiesner (Remake of the TV film Das Fenster zum Flur)
  (1964), as Oberschwester Gertrud
 Der rote Strumpf (1981), as Maria Panacek

References

External links 
 
 https://news.yahoo.com/news?tmpl=story&u=/afp/20040710/en_afp/germany_theater_obit_040710213952
 http://sueddeutsche.de/panorama/artikel/39/35004/—German text
 http://www.rp-online.de/news/german/2000-0530/meysel.html—older text from 2000 (German)
 https://web.archive.org/web/20050205014137/http://www.emma.de/632252258296745.html // interview in German language (1987)

1910 births
2004 deaths
20th-century German Jews
Jewish German actresses
People from Neukölln
Actresses from Berlin
Actresses from Hamburg
Bisexual actresses
German film actresses
German stage actresses
German television actresses
German television personalities
German LGBT actors
20th-century German actresses
German people of Danish descent
Burials at the Ohlsdorf Cemetery
20th-century German LGBT people